Carrier Airborne Early Warning Squadron 115 (VAW-115), also known as the "Liberty Bells", is a United States Navy airborne early warning and control squadron that flies the E-2C Hawkeye.

Squadron history
The squadron was originally established on 20 April 1967, flying the E-2A Hawkeye. It was assigned to  Attack Carrier Wing Two and deployed on board .

1970s 

VAW-115 transitioned to the E-2B and joined CVW-5 in 1971 and made two combat deployments to the Gulf of Tonkin between May 1971 and April 1973 on board . In September 1973, CVW-5 moved to Yokosuka, Japan as a component of the Forward Deployed Naval Forces, and the only air wing home ported outside the continental United States.

VAW-115 E-2B Hawkeyes performed a command and control role in Operation Frequent Wind, supporting the evacuation of Saigon in April 1975. VAW-115 made eleven deployments to the Indian Ocean and North Arabian Sea, a period which saw such tumultuous events as the Iranian seizure of the American Embassy in Tehran.

1980s 
In 1983, VAW-115 participated in rescue and salvage operations following the Korean Air Lines Flight 007 shootdown. During the 1989-90 deployments with the Midway Battle Group, the squadron and their E-2C Hawkeyes participated in Operation Classic Resolve, supporting the democratic government of the Philippines against a coup attempt.

1990s 
In response to the Iraqi Invasion of Kuwait, VAW-115 deployed to the Persian Gulf in October 1990 as part of Operation Desert Shield. In January 1991, Desert Shield transitioned to Desert Storm and saw VAW-115 flying 179 combat sorties. During the ensuing years, the squadron deployed to the Persian Gulf four times in support of Operation Southern Watch, enforcing a No-Fly Zone over the skies of southern Iraq. In January 1998, VAW-115 and the Independence Battle Group were called upon to participate in various Persian Gulf contingency operations in support of United Nations sanctions.

2000s 
In February 2003, the squadron was once again called to the Persian Gulf to support Operation Southern Watch and flew 46 combat sorties until the commencement of Operation Iraqi Freedom in March 2003. During that operation, the squadron flew 363.8 hours in support of Army and Marine Corps units on the ground.

In the years that followed, VAW-115 participated in exercises such as Valiant Shield, Malabar, and Talisman Saber as well as Exercises Annualex and Keen Sword with the Japanese Air and Maritime Self Defense Forces. VAW-115 took part in joint and multi-national RIMPAC 2008, providing Airborne Battle Space Command and Control to 49 naval vessels, 150 aircraft, and 29 other foreign and U.S. units from 10 participating countries.

2010s 

In February 2010 the squadron began reequipping with the E-2C Hawkeye 2000. The improved E-2C Hawkeye 2000 carries advanced capabilities over its predecessor in the areas of detection, processing, identification, communication and navigation.

VAW-115 has achieved 24 years and 50,000 hours of Class-A mishap-free flight hours receiving eight Battle Efficiency "E" awards, seven AEW Excellence awards, and six Safety "S" awards.

On 2 February 2017, VAW-125 arrived at Marine Corps Air Station Iwakuni, Japan to replace VAW-115 in Carrier Air Wing Five aboard the aircraft carrier . In the summer of 2017 the squadron moved to Naval Air Station Point Mugu. 

All VAW Squadrons are now Airborne Command and Control Squadrons.

2020s 

In 2022, VAW-115 transitioned to the E-2D Advanced Hawkeye.

See also

 History of the United States Navy
 List of United States Navy aircraft squadrons

References

External links
 VAW-115 official website

Early warning squadrons of the United States Navy